Johann Burianek (16 November 1913 – 2 August 1952) was a former Wehrmacht soldier and CIA-backed insurgent who planned and committed several attacks against the German Democratic Republic and a member of the anti-communist KGU.

In a 1952 trial he was condemned to death in the country's Supreme Court for preparing attacks on railway bridges. He was the first person to receive a death sentence from the new country's justice system.

Life

Early years
Burianek was born in the Rheinland at Düsseldorf, the son of a master shoe maker. He underwent an apprenticeship as a machinist and in 1932 relocated to Czechoslovakia, taking Czechoslovak nationality in 1932/33. He served in the German airforce during the 1930s and in 1939 took back his German nationality.

Wehrmacht Service in WWII
During the Second World War, Burianek served in the Wehrmacht. In the final days of the war, Burianek arrested a deserter whom he then delivered to his military headquarters. The deserter was nearly executed as a result of Burianek's actions. In November 1949, an East German court found Burianek guilty of crimes against humanity for reporting the deserter and sentenced him to one year in prison.

Insurgent Attacks Against the German Democratic Republic
Burianek was released on probation in April 1950, having served nearly half his sentence. He found work as a truck driver with the Volkseigener Betrieb (publicly owned business) Secura-Mechanik. Between July 1950 and March 1951 he smuggled several thousand copies of the western newsheets Kleiner Telegraf and Tarantel into the Soviet sector of Berlin. In March 1951 he joined a militant insurgent group called "Struggle against Inhumanity" group (KgU / Kampfgruppe gegen Unmenschlichkeit) which was then being established by Rainer Hildebrandt with backing from the Americans. His attacks on the part of the KgU included numerous acts of sabotage and unsuccessful arson attacks on the 1951 World Festival of Youth and Students.

His most ambitious project, planned for 21 February 1952, would have involved blowing up a civilian railway bridge at Erkner, on the south-eastern edge of Berlin, which would have de-railed the "Blue Express", the long-distance train running between Berlin and Moscow via Warsaw. Despite knowing this almost certainly would cause mass civilian casualties, Burianek proceeded with the plot. The necessary explosives would be provided by the KgU. However, the project failed to progress beyond the planning stage, as it proved impossible to get hold of a suitable truck to carry the explosives. On 5 March 1952, Burianek was arrested on charges of terrorism.

Trial and execution
Some ten weeks later, on 15 May 1952, Burianek was tried before the Supreme Court. - The presiding judge was Hilde Benjamin, the court's vice-president. Burianek was accused and found to be an agent of the KgU.

The court delivered its verdict on 25 May 1952, and Johann Burianek became the first defendant in the German Democratic Republic to receive a death sentence. Two months after receiving his sentence, Burianek was executed by guillotine.

Rehabilitation by the Berlin regional court
In 2005 Johann Burianek's conviction was found to have been unconstitutional, because of "serious disregard for basic rules [of justice]"<ref>..."gravierender Missachtung elementarer materieller Vorschriften"</ref> in the original trial. The 1952 verdict was reversed. This reversal arose from an initiative by the "Arbeitsgemeinschaft 13. August" organisation which had been established, like the KgU before it, by Rainer Hildebrandt, and which now successfully applied to the Berlin District Court to have the 1992 Criminal Rehabilitation Act invoked for the Burianek case. In a judgement delivered on 2 September 2005, the court also held that between his arrest on 5 March 1952 and his execution on 2 August 1952 Johann Burianek had been unlawfully deprived of his freedom.Landgericht Berlin: Beschluss vom 2. September 2005 – (551 Rh) 3 Js 28.9/05 (361/05).

Controversial Legacy
In Germany, under §189 of the criminal code, defamation of the memory of a deceased person is a criminal offence which upon conviction may attract a fine or a prison term of up to two years. The Burianek case hit the headlines again in 2012 and 2013 on account of a former Stasi officer, Colonel Wolfgang Schmidt, who used his internet site to describe Burianek as a "bandit" and as the "leader of a terrorist organisation".„Anführer einer terroristischen Vereinigung“ On 27 September 2012 Schmidt was convicted under §189 in respect of the matter by a court which evidently accepted that Schmidt's characterizations of Burianek had been false and defamatory. The court ordered Schmidt to pay a fine of €1,200.

The action against Schmidt had been triggered by Hubertus Knabe, the director of the Hohenschönhausen Memorial Museum on the northern edge of Berlin.The Hohenschönhausen Memorial Museum was opened in 1994 on the site of what had previously been run by the Stasi as a (still well-remembered) political prison. It was not the first time Knabe and Schmidt had come across one another, Schmidt already having been fined €2,100 in 2009 for calling Knabe himself a "publicly unrestrained rabble rouser" ("öffentlich und ungestraft als Volksverhetzer") in connection with Knabe's earlier work on the Stasi.Peter Kirschey: Persilschein für Bombenleger. neues deutschland vom 3. Dezember 2012.

Schmidt appealed against the €1,200 fine, imposed under §189 for defaming the memory of Johann Burianek, but on 18 March 2013 the District Court rejected his appeal. Knabe welcomed the court's verdict: "I am pleased that the Justice System stands up against historical revisionism from former Stasi operatives. Even today, we must not allow the perpetrators to denigrate their victims in public.""Ich freue mich, dass die Justiz dem Geschichtsrevisionismus ehemaliger Stasi-Mitarbeiter entgegentritt. Es kann nicht sein, dass die Täter ihre Opfer auch heute noch öffentlich herabwürdigen." He also stressed the significance of a court decision which, for the first time, extended §189 of the Criminal code to include negative portrayals of those convicted by the German Democratic Republic.

Further reading
 Kai-Uwe Merz: Kalter Krieg als antikommunistischer Widerstand. Die Kampfgruppe gegen Unmenschlichkeit 1948–1959, München: Oldenbourg, 1987. 
 Rudi Beckert: Die erste und letzte Instanz. Schau- und Geheimprozesse vor dem Obersten Gericht der DDR, Keip Verlag, Goldbach 1995, S.237–248
 Karl Wilhelm Fricke, Roger Engelmann: Konzentrierte Schläge Staatssicherheitsaktionen u. polit. Prozesse in der DDR 1953 – 1956, Berlin 1998
 Gerhard Finn: Nichtstun ist Mord. Die Kampfgruppe gegen Unmenschlichkeit''. Westkreuz-Verlag, Bad Münstereifel 2000, S. 119–124

References

1913 births
1952 deaths
German anti-communists
German Army personnel of World War II
German people convicted of crimes against humanity
People executed by East Germany by guillotine
People from the Rhine Province
Executed East German people